Mayday Parade is the third studio album by American rock band Mayday Parade. It was released by Fearless on October 4, 2011.

The album debuted at number 12 on the U.S. Billboard 200, selling near to 27,000 copies in its first week, becoming the band's second highest charted album to date.

Background and production
In March 2009 it was announced Mayday Parade had signed to Atlantic. While working on their major label debut, Anywhere but Here (2009), Atlantic expected the band to make a pop album. While the band attempted to follow this direction, they were weighed down by "so much overbearing pressure", according to guitarist Brooks Betts. Vocalist Derek Sanders later recalled that "there was a lot of outside influence" from Atlantic that resulted in "a lot of co-writes". In retrospect, Sanders said the band simply recorded songs that they "didn't care about as much or love as much". Brooks pointed out that it wasn't "the best representation [of the band]."

The album was written by the band during early 2011 at a beach house in Panacea, Florida. For this album, the band wrote all of the material. "Stay" is about pain experienced when losing a loved one. They began recording with Zack Odom and Kenneth Mount on February 24, 2011 and the record was reportedly completed "[the band's] way," not "someone else's way," on April 18. Recording took place at Vinatage Song Studio in Alpharetta, Georgia and at Tree Sound Studios in Norcross, Georgia. The group brought in a string section for certain tracks.

Release
On July 6, 2011 Mayday Parade was announced for release and the track listing was revealed. In July and August, the band supported All Time Low on their North America tour. "Oh Well, Oh Well" was made available for streaming via Alternative Press on July 27. On July 31, the artwork was revealed. "Oh Well, Oh Well" was released as a single on August 1. On September 8, "When You See My Friends" was made available for streaming via MTV, and was released as a single a day later. Short clips of every song on the album were made available for steaming on September 22. On October 3, Mayday Parade was made available for streaming, and was released a day later through ILG. On October 7, a music video was released for "Oh Well, Oh Well", which was directed by Thunder Down Country. In October and November, the band went on The Noise Tour with support from We Are the In Crowd, There for Tomorrow, You Me at Six, The Make and Sparks the Rescue.

In January 2012 the band filmed a music video for "Stay" in Ohio. In February and March, the band went on a co-headlining tour with We the Kings, with support from The Downtown Fiction and Anarbor. The band supported You Me at Six on their tour of the UK in March and April. On April 4, the "Stay" music video was released, which was directed by Thunder Down Country. On April 12, the band released an acoustic version of "When You See My Friends" as a free download. The band went on the 2012 edition of Warped Tour. In early June, the band toured Japan on the 2012 edition of the Beyond [The] Blue tour. In September, the group performed at the Bazooka Rocks Festival in the Philippines. The band went on co-headlining tour with The Maine, with support from The Postelles, in October and November. In December, the band went on a short Australian tour with We Are the In Crowd and Heroes for Hire.

Reception

Mayday Parade was projected to sell 25,000 copies, it eventually sold near to 27,000 copies in the first week, an increase of 30% over their previous album's first week sales. "Stay" charted at number 26 on the Rock Digital Songs chart in the U.S. The album was ranked at number 4 on PopMatters' best pop punk releases of 2011 list. The album has sold over 100,000 copies in the US as of 2014.

Track listing

Bonus tracks

Personnel
Personnel per digital booklet.

Mayday Parade
 Jake Bundrick – drums, vocals
 Jeremy Lenzo – bass guitar, vocals
 Derek Sanders – lead vocals, keyboard
 Alex Garcia – lead guitar
 Brooks Betts – rhythm guitar

Additional musicians
 Chris Barry – choral arrangements
 Chris Barry, Jennie Barry, Andy Barry, Anne Lokey – choir
 Zack Odom – string arrangements, viola
 Seth Mann – 1st and 2nd violin
 Gail Burnett – cello
 Kenneth (G) Mount – trumpet

Production
 Zack Odom, Kenneth Mount – producers, recording
 Chad McCure – 2nd engineer drum tracking
 Daniel Korneff – mixing
 UE Nastasi – mastering
 Jerrod Landon Porter – illustration & design

Chart positions

References
 Footnotes

 Citations

External links

Mayday Parade at YouTube (streamed copy where licensed)

2011 albums
Mayday Parade albums
Fearless Records albums